The Stolojan Cabinet was the Cabinet of the Government of Romania between 16 October 1991 and 19 November 1992. It was the fourth post-communist cabinet. The Prime Minister was Theodor Stolojan, a former financial bureaucrat during communism (previously responsible with the foreign currency as well as the money of the Securitatea, according to former Romanian President Emil Constantinescu). Stolojan was an independent minister of finance in the Roman cabinet, dominated by the FSN. The Stolojan Cabinet was a transition cabinet, in charge with organizing the elections, and included FSN members and members from other parties national liberals, ecologists, agrarians, and independents.

Membership

Prime Minister: 
Theodor Stolojan

Ministers: 
Mircea Ionescu-Quintus (Justice)
Niculae Spiroiu (Defense)
Ludovic Spiess (Culture)
Petru Mărculescu (Agriculture)
Adrian Năstase (Foreign Affairs)
George Danielescu (Economy and Finance)
Victor Babiuc (Interior)
Mihail Golu (Education)
Marcian Bleahu (Environment)
Dan Nicolae (Public Works)
Dan Mircea Popescu (Labor)
Traian Băsescu (Transport)
Mircea Maiorescu (Health)
Andrei Chirică (Communications)
Dan Constantinescu (Industry)
Ion Aurel Stoica (Relation with Parliament)
Florian Bercea (Budget, State Revenues and Financial Control)
Constantin Fota (Commerce and Tourism)
Ioan Moldovan (Youth and Sport)

Stolojan I Cabinet
1991 establishments in Romania
1992 disestablishments in Romania
Cabinets established in 1991
Cabinets disestablished in 1992